The 2022 German Figure Skating Championships were held on December 9–11, 2021 at the Eissporthalle Neuss in Neuss. Skaters competed in the disciplines of men's singles and ladies' singles on the senior level and pair skating and ice dance on the senior, junior, and novice levels. Single skating competitions on the junior and novice levels were held on December 17–19, 2021 at the Eissportzentrum Westfalen in Dortmund. The results of the national championships were among the criteria used to choose the German teams for the 2022 European Championships, 2022 Winter Olympics, 2022 European Youth Olympic Winter Festival, 2022 World Championships and 2022 Junior World Championships.

Medalists

Senior results

Men

Women

Pairs

Ice dance

Junior results

Men

Women

Pairs

Ice dance

International team selections

Winter Universiade 
The 2021 Winter Universiade, originally scheduled for 21–31 January 2021 in Lucerne, Switzerland, was postponed to 11–21 December 2021 but finally it was cancelled definitively on 29 November 2021.

European Championships 
The 2022 European Championships were held in Tallinn, Estonia from 10 to 16 January 2022. Germany's team was published on December 14, 2021.

Winter Olympics 
The 2022 Winter Olympics was held in Beijing, China from 4 to 20 February 2022. Germany's team was published on January 19, 2022.

Names denoted with an asterisk (*) are skaters/teams eligible for the team event only.

European Youth Olympic Winter Festival 
The 2022 European Youth Olympic Winter Festival, originally scheduled for 6–13 February 2021 in Vuokatti, Finland, was postponed to 11–18 December 2021 and then to 20–25 March 2022. The German entry was announced on March 10, 2022.

World Championships 
The 2022 World Championships were held in Montpellier, France from 21 to 27 March 2022. Germany's team was published on February 28, 2022.

World Junior Championships 
Commonly referred to as "Junior Worlds", the 2022 World Junior Championships were originally scheduled for 7–13 March 2022 in Sofia, Bulgaria before postponing to 13–17 April 2022 in Tallinn, Estonia.  The German team was announced on March 10, 2022.

References

External links 

 2022 German Championships: Senior results at the Deutsche Eislauf Union
 2022 German Championships: Junior and novice results at the Deutsche Eislauf Union